Cole Green may refer to:
Cole Green (baseball) (born 1989), American baseball player
Cole Green, Brent Pelham, a location in Hertfordshire, England
Cole Green, Hertfordshire, a hamlet in Hertingfordbury, Hertfordshire, England
Cole Green railway station, a closed station